The 12th Corps was a corps of the Yugoslav Partisans that fought against the Germans, Independent State of Croatia (NDH) and Chetniks in occupied Democratic Federal Yugoslavia during World War II. 

It was formed on 1 July 1944 with the 16th Vojvodina Division and 36th Vojvodina Division and subsequently took the 51st Vojvodina Division under command. It was subordinated to the Partisan 3rd Army on 1 January 1945. The 12th Corps spent the latter half of 1944 engaged in hard fighting against the 13th Waffen Mountain Division of the SS Handschar (1st Croatian) in eastern Bosnia.

The Corps also participated in the Belgrade Offensive (October 1944) and Battle of Batina (November 1944).

Notes

References
 
 

Corps of the Yugoslav Partisans
Military units and formations established in 1944